Alexander or Alex Mitchell may refer to:

Born before 1900
 Alexander Mitchell (British politician) (1831–1873), MP for Berwick-upon-Tweed 1865–1868
 Alexander Mitchell (engineer) (1780–1868), blind Irish engineer
 Alexander Mitchell (Wisconsin politician) (1817–1887), president of the Milwaukee Road railroad, US Representative from Wisconsin
 Alexander C. Mitchell (1860–1911), member of the U.S. House of Representatives from Kansas
 Alexander Crichton Mitchell (1864–1952), Scottish physicist
 Alexander Ferrier Mitchell (1822–1899), Scottish ecclesiastical historian and Moderator of the General Assembly of the Church of Scotland
 Alexander H. Mitchell (1840–1913), United States military officer

Born after 1900
 Alexander Mitchell (Saskatchewan politician) (1912–2003), politician in Saskatchewan, Canada
 Alexander Graham Mitchell (born 1923), first Governor of the Turks and Caicos, 1973–1975
 Alex Mitchell (Australian footballer) (1912–2001), Australian rules footballer for South Melbourne
 Alex Mitchell (Australian journalist) (born 1942), journalist in Britain and Australia
 Alex Mitchell (English footballer) (born 2001), English footballer for Millwall and Leyton Orient
 Alex Mitchell (journalist) (1947–2010), British journalist and editor of Christian magazine Third Way
 Alex Mitchell (musician), American musician and frontman of Circus of Power
 Alex Mitchell (rugby union) (born 1997), English rugby union player
 Alex Mitchell (died 1975), died laughing while watching The Goodies episode Kung Fu Kapers
 Sandy Mitchell (novelist) (born 1958), pseudonym of British writer Alex Stewart
 Sandy Mitchell (prisoner), imprisoned in Saudi Arabia 2000–2003

See also
 Alex Michel (born 1971), American businessman